Mikołaj II Hlebowicz (died 1632), castellan of Vilnius, voivode of Smolensk, marshal of the Lithuanian Tribunal and podstoli of Lithuania.

He was the Son of Jan Hlebowicz, voivode of Trakai. He took part in the Polish–Swedish wars, fighting at Riga and at Kircholm (1605) and later fought in the Polish–Muscovite War (1605–1618).

Together with his wife he converted from Calvinism to Roman Catholicism, sponsoring a monastery in Dubrowna. Hlebowicz was married to Princess Marcybella Anna Korecka and was the father of Jan Samuel Hlebowicz and Jerzy Karol Hlebowicz.

References

J. Hare, GLEBOVICH / / The Golden Horde: The Encyclopedia . The 3 tons Vol.1: Obolensky - Cadence / Editorial Board.: GP Paschke (gal.red.) And others.; Sett. ZE Gerasimov. - Mn.: BelEn 2005. -688 C: Il. C. five hundred and fortieth   (Vol. 1).

Hare Yu  Zaslawye X-XVIII centuries (historical and archaeological survey). - Mn. : Science and Technology, 1987.

Spiridonov MF  Zaslawye in the XVI century. - Mn., 1998.

External links
 https://archive.today/20130108152756/http://kamunikat.fontel.net/www/czasopisy/filamaty/05/07.htm
 https://archive.today/20121203181232/http://fatima.catholic.by/index.php?option=com_content&view=article&id=55&Itemid=29&lang=by

16th-century Lithuanian nobility
17th-century Lithuanian nobility
16th-century Polish nobility
17th-century Polish nobility
Converts to Roman Catholicism from Calvinism
1632 deaths
Polish people of the Polish–Muscovite War (1605–1618)
Polish Roman Catholics
Military personnel of the Polish–Lithuanian Commonwealth
Year of birth unknown
Voivodes of Smolensk